Sir George Garrett (died 30 November 1648) was an English politician who sat in the House of Commons  in 1640.

Garrett was secretary to Miles Fleetwood.  In April 1640, he was elected Member of Parliament for Hindon in the Short Parliament.

Garrett was a member of the Worshipful Company of Drapers. He was elected Alderman of the City of London for Castle Baynard ward on 15 April 1641. He was Sheriff of London  and Master of the Drapers Company from 1641 to 1642. He was knighted on 3 December 1641.

References

Year of birth missing
1648 deaths
English MPs 1640 (April)